Uukwiyu Constituency is an electoral constituency in the Oshana Region of Namibia. It had 11,894 inhabitants in 2004  and 6,620 registered voters . Its district capital is the settlement of Uukwiyu.

Politics
Uukwiyu constituency is traditionally a stronghold of the South West Africa People's Organization (SWAPO) party. In the 2010 regional elections, SWAPO's Andreas Amundjindi won the constituency with 3,701 votes. His only challenger was Salmi Benjameni of the Rally for Democracy and Progress (RDP), who received 48 votes. In the 2015 local and regional elections Amundjindi won uncontested and remained councillor after no opposition party nominated a candidate.

Councillor Amundjindi (SWAPO) was re-elected in the 2020 regional election. He received 2,406 votes, followed by Johannes Shigwedha of the Independent Patriots for Change (IPC), an opposition party formed in August 2020, with 914 votes.

References

Constituencies of Oshana Region
States and territories established in 1992
1992 establishments in Namibia